is a preparation of fish, especially unagi eel, where the fish is split down the back (or belly), gutted and boned, butterflied, cut into square fillets, skewered, and dipped in a sweet soy sauce-based marinade before being cooked on a grill or griddle.

One can also find canned products labeled as kabayaki-style sanma (Pacific saury).

Kabayaki eel is very popular and a rich source of vitamins A and E, and omega-3 fatty acids. A popular custom from the Edo period calls for eating kabayaki during the summer to gain stamina, especially on a mid-summer day called , which falls between July 18 and August 8 each year.

The eel kabayaki is often served on top of a bowl (donburi) of rice, and called unadon, the fancier form of which is the unajū, placed inside a lacquered box called jūbako. It is also torn up and mixed up evenly with rice to make , which is enjoyed especially in the Nagoya area.

Kantō vs. Kansai

Broadly, two schools of cooking the kabayaki exist. In the Kantō region (eastern Japan), the eel is slit down its back and butterflied, so a lighter-colored stripe of the belly runs down the middle of each fillet on the skin side. The long eel is cut into shorter, squarer fillets and skewered.

In the Kansai region (western Japan), the eel is slit down the belly and directly grilled without being steamed, often still in their original length, and called . The outer skin could be tough and chewy, so eel cooked in Kansai style may be placed between layers of hot rice, for the steam to help tenderize it.

In the Kansai area, the eel is often called mamushi, just like the name of the common viper in Japan, Gloydius blomhoffii). Some speculate the name is a corruption of mabushi meaning "besprinkle", while others say it is a reference to the eel being rather similar to the viper in shape and vigor-endowing abilities when consumed.

Etymology
Several hypothesized origins for the name kabayaki are given. The name came to be generally written using the kanji 蒲焼 meaning cattail-grilled. Resemblance to the brown plush flower spikes of the cattail plant has been suggested as etymological origin in several old writings (the writings of). Food historian (1881–1958) has argued that originally the whole eel was skewered vertically and cooked that way, giving rise to the name on the resemblance to the cattail both in form and color. This is incidentally the same as one hypothesized etymology for kamaboko.

References

Further reading

 (4th edition)

  (world encyclopedia, in Japanese), vol. 7, article on "kabayaki" by 　(1881-1958).

triptych print "Edomae ōkabayaki" Picture by Shuntei, 1806 The British Museum

Japanese cuisine
Japanese seafood